Breathing Tornados is the third studio album by Australian musician Ben Lee, released on 16 November 1998, through Modular Recordings. It peaked at number 13 on the ARIA Albums Chart.

Critical reception
Wendy Mitchell of CMJ New Music Report said, "The adventurous Breathing Tornados proves Lee capable of experimenting with new forms of expression, without abandoning the hooky pop and acoustic folk of his previous work." She said, "In addition to Lee's guitar work, Breathing Tornados unexpectedly offers machine-made beats, keyboards, horns and assorted weird samples."

Track listing

Personnel
Credits adapted from liner notes.
 Ben Lee – vocals, guitars, bass, percussion
 Ed Buller – keyboards, programming, percussion, production
 Scott Donnel – drums (on "Nothing Much Happens" and "The Finger and the Moon")
 Harmony Korine – monologue (on "Nothing Much Happens")
 Petra Haden – backing vocals (on "Nighttime")
 Donovan Leitch – falsetto vocals (on "Nighttime")
 Sean Lennon – backing vocals (on "Sandpaperback")

Charts

Weekly charts

Year-end charts

Certifications

References

External links
 

1998 albums
Ben Lee albums
Albums produced by Ed Buller
Modular Recordings albums
Grand Royal albums